Billardiera is a genus of small vines and shrubs in the family, Pittosporaceae, which is endemic to Australia. The genus was first formally described in 1793 by botanist James Edward Smith who named it in honour of Jacques Labillardière, a French botanist.

Description
Members of the genus, Billardiera, are woody climbers. The leathery leaves are alternate. The 5-merous hermaphroditic flowers are usually terminal, and may be solitary or clustered. The perianth consists of a distinct calyx and corolla. The petals are clawed. The anthers shed their pollen via longitudinal slits. There is one hairless style & stigma. The ovary is superior and either 2 or 3 locular, with the  placentation being parietal. The fruit is either a two-celled capsule or a berry with one or two cells. The wingless seeds are often covered in a mucilaginous pulp.

Distribution
The genus is endemic to Australia and found in all states and territories except the Northern Territory

Species include 
 Billardiera bicolor (Putt.) E.M.Benn.
 Billardiera coriacea Benth. 
 Billardiera cymosa F.Muell. 
 Billardiera drummondii (C.Morren) L.Cayzer & Crisp
 Billardiera floribunda (Putt.) F.Muell. (White-flowered billardiera)
 Billardiera fraseri (Hook.) F.Muell. (Elegant pronaya)
 Billardiera fusiformis Labill. (Australian bluebell)
 Billardiera heterophylla (Lindl.) L.Cayzer & Crisp (Bluebell creeper, purple appleberry, Australian bluebell) 
 Billardiera laxiflora (Benth.) E.M.Benn. 
 Billardiera lehmanniana F.Muell.
 Billardiera longiflora Labill.  
 Billardiera macrantha Hook.f.
 Billardiera mutabilis Salisb. (Climbing appleberry)
 Billardiera nesophila L.Cayzer & D.L.Jones 
 Billardiera ovalis Lindl.  
 Billardiera procumbens (Hook.)
 Billardiera rubens L.Cayzer, Crisp & I.Telford 
 Billardiera scandens Sm.    (Hairy appleberry) 
 Billardiera sericophora F.Muell. 
 Billardiera speciosa (Endl.) 
 Billardiera uniflora E.M.Benn. 
 Billardiera variifolia DC. 
 Billardiera venusta (Putt.) L.Cayzer & Crisp 
 Billardiera versicolor F.Muell. ex Klatt (Pale appleberry)
 Billardiera villosa (Turcz.) E.M.Benn.
 Billardiera viridiflora L.Cayzer & D.L.Jones

References

External links

Billardiera Key to South Australian species eloraSA Electronic Flora of South Australia.
Association of Societies for Growing Australian Plants (ASGAP): Billardiera scandens
 Bennett, E.M. 1972. 
 Bennett, E.M. 1978. 

 
Apiales genera
Flora of Western Australia
Flora of South Australia
Flora of Queensland
Flora of New South Wales
Flora of Victoria (Australia)
Flora of the Australian Capital Territory
Endemic flora of Tasmania
Taxa named by James Edward Smith